Onyshchenko, also transliterated as Onyschenko, is a Ukrainian surname. There exists a Russified version of the surname, Anishchenko.

Notable people with the surname include:

Boris Onishchenko (born 1937), Ukrainian modern pentathlete
Denys Onyshchenko (born 1978), Ukrainian footballer
Oleksandr Onyshchenko (born 1969), Ukrainian politician
Volodymyr Onyshchenko (born 1949), Soviet footballer and Ukrainian manager

See also
 Onishchenko
 Anishchenko
 
 

Ukrainian-language surnames